Canoville is a surname. Notable people with the surname include:

Lee Canoville (born 1981), English professional footballer
Paul Canoville (born 1962), English professional footballer